The 1917–18 season  was Madrid Football Club's 16th season in existence. The club played some friendly matches. They also played in the Campeonato Regional Centro (Central Regional Championship) and the Copa del Rey.

Friendlies

Competitions

Overview

Campeonato Regional Centro

League table

Matches

Copa del Rey

Quarterfinals

Semifinals

Final

Notes

References

External links
Realmadrid.com Official Site
1917–18 Squad
1917–18 matches
1917–18 (Campeonato de Madrid)
International Friendlies of Real Madrid CF – Overview

Real Madrid CF
Real Madrid CF seasons